Kundgol Assembly constituency is one of the 224 assembly constituencies in the state of Karnataka in India. It is one of the 8 constituencies which make up Dharwad (Lok Sabha constituency).

Members of Assembly
 1972 : R. V. Rangangowda (INC)
 2018 : Channabasappa Sathyappa Shivalli (INC) 
 2019 Kusumavathi C Shivalli

Election results

2019 Bypoll

1972 Assembly Election
 R. V. Rangangowda (INC) : 25,694 votes
 B. S. Rayappa		NCO	16659

2018 Assembly Election
 Channabasappa Sathyappa Shivalli (INC) : 64,871 votes
 Chikkanagoudra Siddanagoud Ishwaragod (BJP) : 64237
Current MLA Smt Kusumavati C Shivalli

References 

Assembly constituencies of Karnataka